Louis IV of Legnica (Brzeg, 19 April 1616 – Legnica, 24 November 1663) was a duke of Brzeg from 1633 (together with his brothers until 1654), of Wołów (during 1653–1654 with his brothers) and of Legnica from 1653 (until 1654 with his brothers, after this alone).

He was the fifth but second surviving son of John Christian, Duke of Brzeg-Legnica-Wołów-Oława, by his first wife, Dorothea Sibylle, daughter of John George, Elector of Brandenburg.

Life
After the death of their father in 1639, Louis IV and his younger brother Christian inherited Brzeg and Oława together with their oldest brother George III, who had been appointed administrator of the Duchies by the Emperor six years before. After the death of their uncle George Rudolf in 1653 without issue, the brothers inherited his lands of Legnica and Wołów. In 1654, they decided to a division of their domains: Louis IV obtained Legnica, George III retained Brzeg, and Christian received the small towns of Oława and Wołów.

Marriage and issue
In Brzeg on 8 May 1649, Louis IV married Anna Sophie (Harzgerode, 29 September 1628 - Prochowice, 10 February 1666), daughter of John Albert II, Duke of Mecklenburg-Güstrow by his third wife, Eleonore Maria of Anhalt-Bernburg, first cousin of Louis IV's father John Christian; thus, the spouses were second cousins. They had one son:

Christian Albert (b. 7 November 1651 - d. 20 January 1652).

After his death without surviving issue, Louis IV was succeeded by his brothers George III and Christian. George III died soon thereafter, and Christian reunited all their lands under his rule.

References

Genealogical database by Herbert Stoyan

|-

|-

|-

1616 births
1663 deaths
Dukes of Brzeg
Dukes of Legnica